M7 Aerospace LP is an aerospace company with its headquarters on the property of San Antonio International Airport in Uptown San Antonio, Texas, United States.

M7 is the successor organization to Fairchild Dornier Aviation, having bought much of that firm's assets out of bankruptcy. M7 occupies the  manufacturing and support facility formerly operated by Fairchild-Dornier.

M7 Aerospace has five distinct business units:
 Aircraft Parts and Product Support
 Government logistics support
 Aerostructures manufacturing
 Aircraft Maintenance, Repair and Overhaul (MRO)
 Aerial orthorectified imaging

On December 15, 2010, M7 was purchased by the United States subsidiary of the Israeli defense contractor Elbit Systems. The price of M7's acquisition was $85 million in cash.

In 2019, M7 received a $22 million contract from Support Systems Associates, Inc. (SSAI) to provide avionics upgrades to the US Air National Guard's RC-26B aircraft, with SSAI having received a contract to upgrade the same systems for $31 million from the United States Department of Defense the previous year. M7 is the original equipment manufacturer for the RC-26Bs. Two years prior, M7 received a $176 million contract from DynCorp to provide maintenance work related to the US Army's fleet of C-26s and C-35s.

References

External links 
 Official site.

2010 mergers and acquisitions
Aerospace companies of the United States
Defense companies of the United States
Manufacturing companies based in San Antonio